Denis Leonidovich Matsuev ( /ma'tsujef/; born June 11, 1975) is a Russian classical pianist and occasional jazz performer.

Biography
Born in Irkutsk, Soviet Union, Matsuev is the only child of two musicians, as his mother is a piano teacher and his father is a pianist and composer. He demonstrated a musical ear at age 3, when he reproduced on the piano at home a melody that he heard on television. His father subsequently became his first piano teacher. Until age 15, Matsuev studied music in Irkutsk. In 1990, he won a prize at the "New Names Charitable Foundation" competition in Irkutsk and received a stipend, $1,000 a month, from the foundation to study music in Moscow. With other young gifted musicians from Russia discovered by the foundation, Matsuev went on tour in Europe and the United States.

In 1991, Matsuev moved with his parents to Moscow to continue his musical education. He studied at the Central Music School at the Moscow Conservatory. In 1994, he took part at his first international piano competition in Johannesburg, South Africa, where he was awarded the Grand Prix. In the same year, he entered the Moscow Conservatory as a student of Aleksey Nasedkin. After 1997, he studied under Sergei Dorensky. Matsuev won the 11th International Tchaikovsky Competition in 1998 at age 23.

Matsuev is artistic co-director of the international "Annecy Classic Festival" in Annecy, France, with Pascal Escande. He is also the organizer and artistic director of two international festivals in Russia: "Stars on Baikal" in his native city of Irkutsk and the annual music festival "Crescendo". 

In 2012 Matsuev became artistic director of the 1st International "Astana Piano Passion" Festival and Competition, and in 2013 he was artistic director of the International Festival and Competition "Sberbank DEBUT" in Kyiv. 

Matsuev and 80 other Russian artists signed a collective letter "to support the position of President Vladimir Putin on Ukraine and Crimea."

In February 2014, at the XXII Olympic Winter Games in Sochi, Matsuev was a torchbearer, and performed in the closing ceremony. 

In 2018 Matsuev was awarded the Russian Order of Honour.

In 2022, due to his public support of Vladimir Putin, Matsuev's appearance with the Vienna Philharmonic in New York on February 25, 2022, was cancelled and he was replaced by pianist Seong-Jin Cho.

Awards, titles and honors

 UNESCO Goodwill Ambassador
 Order of Honour, 2018
 Russian National Music Award - Best Instrumentalist in Classical Music, 2016, 2017, 2018, 2019; Special Prize for Exceptional Performing Skills, 2015

Discography
 Haydn, Liszt, Tchaikovsky, Prokofiev. © & (P) 1997 New Names.
 Haydn, Chopin, Liszt, Rachmaninov, Prokofiev. © & (P) Vivendi, 1999.
 Beethoven, Tchaikowsky, Liszt, Prokofiev. Collection Etoiles. Live recording – Eglise Notre-Dame d'Auvers-sur-Oise, 27 May 2000.
 Liszt: Mephisto Waltz S.514, Schumann: Symphonic Etudes Op. 13, Schubert: Piano Sonata No. 14 in A minor D.784. Sacrambow (Japan), © & (P) 2000 JAPAN ARTS.
 Classic Masterpieces. Budapest Philharmonic Orchestra. Conductor Rico Saccani. Tchaikovsky – Piano concertos Nos. 1 & 2. Soloist: Denis Matsouev. © & (P) 2003 Independent Music & Media Alliance LTD.
 Tribute to Horowitz. Liszt, Bizet-Horowitz, Rossini-Ginzburg. (P) & © 2004 BMG Russia.
 Stravinsky – Firebird Suite, Shchedrin – Piano Concerto No. 5. Mariss JAansons – Symphonieorchester des Bayerischen Rundfunks – © 2005 Sony BMG Music Entertainment
 Stravinsky & Tchaikovsky. I. Stravinsky – Three Movements From Petrouchka; P. I. Tchaikovsky – The Seasons. RCA Red Seal. (P) & © 2005 Sony BMG Music Entertainment.
 Tchaikovsky: Piano Concerto No. 1 & Shostakovich: Concerto for Piano, Trumpet and Strings. St Petersburg PO/Temirkanov. RCA Red Seal (P) & © 2007 Sony BMG Music Entertainment.
 Unknown Rachmaninoff, 18 March 2008, RCA Red Seal.
 The Carnegie Hall Concert – Denis Matsuev (20 October 2009) RCA Red Seal.
 Rachmaninov Piano Concerto No. 3, Rhapsody on a Theme of Paganini – Denis Matsuev, Gergiev, and Mariinsky Orchestra (9 February 2010
 Franz Liszt. Russian National Orchestra and Michail Pletnev. Sony Music Entertainment (Russia), 2011.
 Franz Liszt – Piano concertos nos. 1 & 2 Totentanz; Orpheus ; Héroïde funèbre. [New York]: Sony, 2011.
 Sjostakovitj, Dmitrij, Valerij Gergiev, and Rodion Stjedrin. Piano concertos nos. 1 & 2. State Academic Mariinsky Theatre, 2011.
 Rachmaninov Piano Concerto No. 2; Gershwin: Rhapsody In Blue. Sony Bmg Music, 2013.
 Szymanowski: Symphonies Nos. 3 & 4, Stabat Mater. London Symphony Orchestra, Valery Gergiev (Conductor), Denis Matsuev (Artist), London Symphony Chorus (Orchestra) Format: Audio CD, 2013LSO Live Production
 Tchaikovsky: Piano Concertos Nos. 1 & 2 Denis Matsuev (Artist, Performer), Mariinsky Orchestra, Valery Gergiev (Conductor), Pyotr Ilyich Tchaikovsky (Composer), Format: Audio CD, 2014 Mariinsky Label
 Prokofiev: Piano Concerto No. 3, Symphony No. 5 Denis Matsuev (Performer), Mariinsky Orchestra, Valery Gergiev (Conductor), Sergei Prokofiev (Composer), Format: Audio CD, 2014 Mariinsky Label
 Rachmaninov Piano Concerto No. 1(1917 Edition), Stravinsky Capriccio for Piano and Orchestra (1929), Shchedrin Piano Concerto No. 2 (1936) Denis Matsuev, Piano The Mariinsky Orchestra conducted by Valery Gergiev. Mariinsky Label 2015.
 Rachmaninov Piano Concerto No. 2, Prokofiev Piano Concerto No. 2. CD, Mariinky Label January 2018

References

External links
 
 Moscow Philharmonic – Matsuev Denis
 Columbia Artists Management Inc. – Denis Matsuev
 Annecy Festival page on Denis Matsuev

1975 births
Russian classical pianists
Male classical pianists
People's Artists of Russia
State Prize of the Russian Federation laureates
Living people
Prize-winners of the International Tchaikovsky Competition
Moscow Conservatory alumni
Russian National Music Award winners
20th-century Russian musicians
20th-century classical pianists
20th-century Russian male musicians
21st-century Russian musicians
21st-century classical pianists
21st-century Russian male musicians
Anti-Ukrainian sentiment in Russia